Victor Pinzaru (born February 11, 1992) is a biathlete from Moldova. He competed for Moldova at the 2010 Winter Olympics. Pinzaru was Moldova's flag bearer during the 2010 Winter Olympics opening ceremony.

References 

1992 births
Living people
Moldovan male biathletes
Moldovan male cross-country skiers
Biathletes at the 2010 Winter Olympics
Cross-country skiers at the 2014 Winter Olympics
Olympic biathletes of Moldova
Olympic cross-country skiers of Moldova